How to Become a Tyrant is a Netflix docu-series narrated by Peter Dinklage.

Plot
The narrator states that everybody wants absolute power to transform society to their liking and proceeds to explain how such power can be obtained and sustained. The docu-series proceeds to analyze biographies of historical dictators Adolf Hitler, Saddam Hussein, Idi Amin, Joseph Stalin, Muammar Gaddafi and the Kim family.

Cast
 Peter Dinklage as Narrator
 Waller Newell as commentator

Episodes

Production
The series was executive produced by David Ginsberg, Jake Laufer, Jonas Bell Pasht, Peter Dinklage, and Jonah Bekhor. The series was released on Netflix on 9 July 2021. The British Board of Film Classification issued a '15' certificate for the series.

Reception 
The series garnered criticism, especially from Jim Shannon, that it mostly ignored Mao Zedong.

See also 

 The Dictator's Handbook, by Bruce Bueno de Mesquita and Alastair Smith

References

External links
 
 
 

2021 American television series debuts
English-language Netflix original programming
Netflix original documentary television series
Peter Dinklage
Documentary television series about politics
Cultural depictions of Adolf Hitler
Cultural depictions of Joseph Stalin
Cultural depictions of Idi Amin
Cultural depictions of Saddam Hussein
Cultural depictions of Muammar Gaddafi
Cultural depictions of Kim Jong-il
Cultural depictions of Kim Jong-un